Hero of Two Worlds: The Marquis de Lafayette in the Age of Revolution is a 2021 biography of the Marquis de Lafayette, including his clashes with the successive governments of France until his death in 1834. Lafayette is a hero of the American Revolution. After his return to France, Lafayette became a central figure during the French Revolution, was the main author of the 1789 Declaration of the Rights of Man and of the Citizen, and was active in the July Revolution of 1830. This book was written by Mike Duncan, a history podcaster. It was published in August 2021 by PublicAffairs.

About the book
The book is written for the general public. It consists of three parts and two 'interludes' which divide 24 chapters.  The book also contains a bibliography. The title of the Part 1 is "Cur Non", Part 2 is entitled "La Revolution" and Part 3 is entitled "The Republican Kiss". The interludes precede Part 2 and Part 3 and serve to place the topics in relief against the backdrop of the book. The title of the First Interlude is "The Liberties of All Mankind." The Second Interlude is entitled "The Prisoners of Olmutz."

Lafayette
According to Adam Gopnik of The New Yorker: "History shows us no more lovable a man than Lafayette. He didn’t create a utopian state, or start a reign of terror, or conquer another country, or take power in his own country and lay down the law. But nobody did more to help secure French liberty, rather than merely imagine it, and nobody did more for the best side of the American democratic ideal. Lafayette didn’t write a philosophical book or think up a system, or even win a big battle. He was just a terrific friend to all good causes."

Reception
This book received generally positive reviews:

Jamelle Bouie of the New York Times writes: "Through Lafayette’s adventures and misadventures...Duncan shows readers a Lafayette who...never fails to show the courage of his convictions and never flinches from a fight when his ideals are on the line...Time and again, Duncan shows Lafayette risking his life and reputation for his ideals."

Publishers Weekly said, "Though [this book was] short on analysis, Duncan marshals a wealth of information into a crisp and readable narrative. This sympathetic portrait illuminates the complexities of Lafayette and his revolutionary era."

Deborah Hopkinson of Book Page magazine writes: "In detailing Lafayette’s long career, Duncan takes a measured approach to his subject, making excellent use of primary sources, especially letters. The author effectively balances Lafayette the man with Lafayette the public figure and helps delineate the relationship between the United States and France." Hopkinson also notes that Duncan explores "...Lafayette’s long and enduring popularity with Americans."

See also

Lafayette in the Somewhat United States (2015) by Sarah Vowell 
Battle of Brandywine
Battle of Yorktown

References

External links

American non-fiction books
History books about the American Revolution
Books about the French Revolution
Biographies (books)
2021 non-fiction books
English-language books
Gilbert du Motier, Marquis de Lafayette